Sandy "Sam" Puc' (born November 26, 1969) is an American photographer, commercial video producer, teacher, author, and businesswoman. She served on the board of directors of the Professional Photographers of America for many years. She holds the titles of Print Master and Explorer of Light from Canon USA. Her images have been displayed in magazines, public and professional buildings, billboards, and television.

Personal life
Puc' was born in Salt Lake City, Utah, and raised in Orem, Utah. She is one of Sandra and Ron Critchfield's five children.

Sandy lives in Highland Ranch, Colorado.

Career

Puc' began her career as a photographer at age 17, taking photographs of children in local parks. As a young mother, she moved from Utah to Littleton, CO. During her first half dozen years in Colorado, she worked out of her home, using her master bedroom as a studio. In 2000, she opened her first commercial studio in a strip mall in Littleton, CO.

Early in her career, Puc' focused on children's photography, creating several Limited Edition series portraits. She also photographed families, and began to specialize in pregnancy and newborn portraiture.

While on a business trip/family vacation in 2009, Puc' and two of her children (and several hundred others) were detained because a passenger on their flight to China was diagnosed with the H1N1 virus. The week-long experience stirred an interest in China that resulted in her returning to the country several times to speak. She filmed a documentary on Chinese orphans in 2014.

In 2008, Puc' founded Sam's World University, an online educational tool for photographers. That endeavor later transitioned to Sandy Puc' University. In 2011, she debuted SPTV.me, another online training site. Revamped in 2014 to include her educational site as well, SPTV.me became a talk show that included six rotating hosts and guest speakers to assist photographers in refining their craft and advancing their business.

Philanthropy
In 2000, because of a life-threatening condition her youngest son endured during his first year of life, Puc' created an annual Santa Charity event, which photographs children in elaborate holiday sets with Santa Claus and raises money for Children's Hospital Colorado. In 2003, Puc' began the studio's annual Halloween Charity to benefit The Food Bank of the Rockies. In 2005, along with Cheryl Haggard, Puc' founded Now I Lay Me Down to Sleep, a non-profit organization that provides remembrance photography to families who suffer the loss of a baby. In 2014, Puc' traveled to China with adoption service CCAI to document a group of parents uniting with their children and to Ecuador to film at an orphanage owned by Dando Amor, a non-profit organization that aids orphans.

Publications
 Puc, Sandy; (2008). Sandy Puc' Guide To Children's Portrait Photography. 
 Puc, Sandy (2012). The Really Big Book of Studio Management. 
 Puc, Sandy (2013). The Really Big Book of Studio Pricing.
 Puc, Sandy (2013). Bellies to Babies.

External links
 Official website

1969 births
Living people
American women photographers
Photographers from Utah
21st-century American women